Jason Paige (born January 6, 1969) is an American singer, writer, record producer and actor best known for singing the first theme song for the English version of the Pokémon television series.

Early life and education
He is an alumnus of Fiorello H. LaGuardia High School and the Experimental Theatre Wing at New York University.

Career
Paige is best known for singing the first theme song for the English version of the Pokémon anime. He also sings "Viridian City" and sings as a background vocalist for the Pokémon 2.B.A. Master soundtrack. In an interview with the New York Post in 2016, Paige said he did not expect the song to become popular. In fact, he said that he "didn’t really know much about Pokémon when I did the demo, other than [that] a scene in the cartoon caused a giant bout of epileptic seizures in Japan", referring to the infamous episode "Dennō Senshi Porygon." As a vocalist Paige toured for a year as the lead singer for the band Blood Sweat & Tears. He has sung and beat-boxed with Aerosmith on tour and on the Howard Stern re-mix of the hit single “Pink”. Paige sang backgrounds for Michael Jackson and was the rap soloist for the song "Black or White" when it was performed at Michael Jackson's 30th Anniversary concert at Madison Square Garden. His one-man show is filled with socio-political sexual musical parody, confessions and impersonations.

He can be heard singing backgrounds on The Art of McCartney tribute CD behind Billy Joel, Roger Daltrey, Kiss, Smokey Robinson and others, On the Elite Beat Agents soundtrack, he sings "Canned Heat" and "Walkie Talkie Man." Paige can also be heard on hundreds of various jingles, including Mountain Dew's "Bohemian Rhapsody" and Pepto-Bismol's "Nausea Heartburn Indigestion Diarrhea". He has written a number of songs for the TV series Rob & Big. His voice can also be heard in the Disney TV movie, The Color of Friendship, “The Jersey Boys”, “Annie” with Kermit the Frog and Miss Piggy in the last “Muppet Movie” and a character or two in “Sausage Party”. He has also performed with famous artists such as Foreigner, The Scorpions, Meat Loaf, Frankie Valli, Liza Minnelli and Enrique Iglesias, Oleta Adams, among many others. He has written and produced for Shoshana Bean, Becky Baeling, Mike Weaver and Suzie McNeil.

As an actor, he can be seen as Peter in An Argentinian in New York, as a choir singer in A Walk to Remember, as the voice over for Buttmeister in Meet the Spartans, as a medic in Make Yourself at Home, as a student in Election and as a parent in The Hustler. From 1995 to 2000, he produced and starred in his own musical comedy sketch show, The What's Up Show, which showed on Manhattan cable TV.

On the stage, he appeared in the 2010 production of Rent at the Hollywood Bowl, as Joe in Frank Zappa's Joe's Garage at the Open Fist Theatre Company, and as Travis in Ty Taylor's The Existents at the Open Fist Theatre Company. He has also done productions of The Who's Tommy, Godspell, Jesus Christ Superstar, and Hair. He has performed at Scott Nevins and Ryan O'Connor's Musical Mondays in Los Angeles, as well as Rockwell's For The Record series in the Coen Brothers, Baz Luhrmann, John Hughes, The Marshalls, Quentin Tarantino, Robert Zemeckis, Paul Thomas Anderson and Scorsese shows. He won a Broadwayworld.com award and an Ovation nomination for his portrayal of Frankie in Fortherecordlive's production of "Scoresese an American Crime Drama" produced at The Wallis Annenberg in October 2016.

He has co-written two musicals, “BOX” and “Writing Pictures” produced at Hartford’s Bushnell Theatre for Black History Month, based on Harriet Beecher Stowe’s Uncle Tom's Cabin and "A Tribute To Irwin Price" Performed at Open Fist Theater.

During the 2012 primary election, Paige himself sang a parody of the Pokémon Theme in support of the Republican candidate Ron Paul. In an interview with Spin Magazine in 2016, Paige said he was inspired by Paul's message of liberty. Later that year, Paige completed a year-long run as the lead singer for Blood, Sweat & Tears and recorded a rock interpretation of the carol Silent Night for an episode of the YouTube series Hellbenders. He is a long time member of Broadway Inspirational Voices and has appeared at Mandalay Bay's LIGHT in For The Record  Baz named after the director Baz Luhrmann.

Paige is also opposed to infant circumcision, having undergone a botched one during his own infancy for religious reasons that resulted in a skin bridge. His mother, Charlie Paige, stated that she regretted having him circumcised. Paige performed and released a song called "Circumcision", a parody of Stevie Wonder's song  "Superstition". He has endorsed brit shalom, an alternative religious ceremony, and produced music for it.

In response to the massive popularity of the Pokémon Go mobile game, Paige re-recorded the theme during the height of the game's popularity in July 2016. Later that month, Paige sang another parody of the theme song featuring Dwayne Johnson as a Pokémon. He performed the song in Los Angeles as well.
In October 2016 he released his anthem "a tribute to Pokémon Go" as a sister theme to the original.
In February 2018 he recorded a metal cover of the original Pokémon theme with Jonathan Young. In December of the same year, he released a long-requested extended version of his interpretation of Silent Night for Hellbenders, stylizing it as a power ballad.

References

External links
 Official Website
 

American male film actors
American male stage actors
American male musical theatre actors
Place of birth missing (living people)
American record producers
New York University alumni
Living people
1969 births
American male singers